Akhanda is a 2021 Indian Telugu-language action drama film written and directed by Boyapati Srinu. It was produced by Miryala Ravinder Reddy, under Dwaraka Creations. It stars Nandamuri Balakrishna in a dual role alongside Pragya Jaiswal, Jagapathi Babu, and Srikanth. The soundtrack album and film score is composed by Thaman S.

Released on 2 December 2021, Akhanda opened to mixed reviews from critics and audience. The film gained popularity because of the soundtrack in the movie. The film became a commercial hit grossing over  crore worldwide, emerging as the third highest-grossing Telugu film of the year and the highest-grossing film in Balakrishna’s career. Akhanda was featured at the 53rd International Film Festival of India in the Indian Panorama mainstream section.

Plot 
In an impenetrable forest, the Indian Army is under severe hunt for a terrifying brigand named Gajendra Sahu. During that encounter, Gajendra Sahu is gravely wounded, and is rescued by a chieftain of a religious organization Maha Rudra Peetam. Upon which, Gajendra listens to the chieftain proclaiming the presence of God is in nature, which must be protected, and the public always bowed their head down before the chieftain because of his chair. Due to this, Gajendra conquers it by slaying the chieftain and cabals to play with nature. Before dying, the chieftain states never to challenge fate, creator, and the universe as he is not able to cope with its reply. 

At the same time, a couple Ramachandraiah and Dharani at Anantapur are blessed with twins in which one is stillborn. Suddenly, an Aghora arrives when the mother is asleep and reveals that one is nature and stillborn is a cataclysm of nature, like that of Lord Shiva's anger. Ramachandraiah cuts the cords, and handover the child to Aghora, who is sent to  Kaasi. While the child rises alive when placed at the sanctum, and is raised under the protection of the Aghoras.  

Years later, Murali Krishna is an arbiter, who is esteemed as a deity. He aims to eradicate factionalism so that the terrain flourishes from four sides. Saranya Bachupally is a newly appointed DC whose acquaintance with Murali Krishna initiates a contretemps that turns into a crush after learning of his ideologies. Antahpuram Varadarajulu, a gangster, illegally manages illegal mining of uranium extraction in a reversed forest. The laborers are subjected to inhumane conditions and treated as slaves. Gajendra Sahu paves the path to Varadarajulu as a soul. Since it is green soil, Saranya assigns Principal Secretary Padmavati to make a secret inquiry. 

Meanwhile, Murali Krishna and Saranya get married and are blessed with a baby girl. One day, multiple children in the region had strange maladies, and doctors are unable to detect the cause behind them. Murali Krishna seeks the government authorities when Padmavati divulges the savagery activities of Varadarajulu, and predicts it should be hindered swiftly. Otherwise, the region becomes a huge graveyard. Listening to it, Murali Krishna flares up on Varadarajulu when he is impeded by his acolyte Central Minister Bharat Reddy and retrieves him to the hospital. At that point, Varadarajulu moves to Gajendra Sahu who ruses by planting a bomb at the hospital leaving several deaths including Bharat Reddy. Following, Murali Krishna is incriminated and prisoned by NIA headed by Krishnamacharya Perumal. 

Eventually, Murali Krishna’s kid also becomes a victim and Saranya rushes to the city hospital. On the way, they are attacked by Varadarajulu’s men while absconding she enters an ancient cave temple, where Akhanda Rudra Sikandar Aghora, Murali Krishna's brother with supernatural powers, who is proceeding under the mission of reinstating temples. He assaults blackguards, bounces back the baby to life, and safely drops them. Being cognizant of it, Gajendra Sahu is frightened and grasps Akhanda as the answer of God. Besides, DSP Ranjan the sidekick of Varadarajulu apprehends Saranya and the entire family. On the verge to slay them, Akhanda appears to eliminate the wicked officers. Forthwith, he interrupts Gajendra Sahu’s ritual by throwing Ranjan’s dead body and giving him an ultimatum. 

Meanwhile, Dharani learns the fact when she rebukes them and decides to recoup her son. Akhanda proclaims that his life is dedicated to the lord which perturbs the mother as she lost the two. Anyhow, Akhanda develops unknown affection for the baby. Once, Akhanda spots Padmavati at a river and detects it through his yogic powers. She had been tortured and suffered to the state by Varadarajulu, due to uncovering the scam. Therefore, he onslaughts on Varadarajulu at the mining area, foredo him and frees the laborers. Currently, Krishnamacharya Perumal departs to seize Akhanda for the bloodbath. As soon as he responds that the extreme from this world and men who try to disturb the balance of nature need to be eradicated. Simultaneously, Krishnamacharya Perumal is aware Murali Krishna is non-guilty via Padmavati and acquits him. 

Later, Gajendra Sahu contacts a Kapalik tantrik, Prachanda to kill Akhanda. Ergo, they spell cursed death over the baby when Akhanda gives a call to Kedari Aghori Baba from Kaasi who foretells to conduct Maha Mrityunjay Homam. Until the completion of the ritual, Akhanda is captive to Shiva, where Gajendra Sahu and Prachanda devise a trap and wallop on him. However, Akhanda bears the pain and finishes the ritual successfully with aid of Murali Krishna. At last, Akhanda manifests him with mighty powers from Shiva, where he wreaks havoc and kills Gajendra and Prachanda. After this, Akhanda leaves, but he promises the child that he will be back if they are in trouble again.

Cast 
 Nandamuri Balakrishna in a dual role as Akhanda Rudra Sikandar Aghora and Murali Krishna
 Pragya Jaiswal as Saranya Bachupally IAS
 Jagapathi Babu as Aghora Baba
 Srikanth as Antahpuram Varadarajulu, the owner of the copper mining
 Nithin Mehta as Gajendra Sahu
 Poorna as Padmavathi IAS, Principal Secretary
 Avinash as Ramachandariah, Akhanda and Murali's father
 Viji Chandrasekhar as Dharani, Akhanda and Murali's mother
 Sharath Lohitashwa as Krishnamacharya Perumal, an NIA officer
 Suresh Chandra Menon as Jagajith Chauhan, a businessman
 Subbaraju as Central Minister A. Bharath Reddy
 Prabhakar as DSP Ranjan and Varadarajulu's younger brother
 Sravan as Varadarajulu's youngest brother
 Ayyappa P Sharma as Prachanda, a Tantrik
 Naga Mahesh as Rajappa
 Chammak Chandra as Murali's fan
 Baby Deshna Javaji as Janani, Saranya and Murali Krishna's daughter

Production

Development 
The film marks the third collaboration between Balakrishna and Boyapati Srinu after Simha (2010) and Legend (2014). It was formally launched at a private event held at Hyderabad in December 2019. The film was tentatively titled as BB3 and NBK106. In April 2021, the film's official title was unveiled as Akhanda.

Cast and crew 
Sayyeshaa was cast for the film for an undisclosed role in November 2020. Later, she left the project due to an unknown reason. It was also reported that Anjali will be part of the film. In March 2021, it was also reported that the action director duo Ram-Laxman has left the film after working for few action scenes. They were later replaced by Stun Shiva. Speaking to the media, in December 2021, Siva told that "I allocated 80 days for 'Akhanda'. Of them, up to 65 days went into mounting action sequences. The rest of the days went into discussing with the director how to elevate the scenes. Ever since the director narrated the story, I started thinking about how to make the fights novel". Initially Prayaga Martin was cast for the lead actress role. Few scenes were also shot featuring her, but was later replaced by Pragya Jaiswal. Pragya was cast in November 2020 after which she joined the production in December 2020. She was  part of a 33-day first schedule shot at Hyderabad, Tamil Nadu and Goa. In an interview with The Times of India, she said that "I had to join the film sets as soon as I was roped in, so my prep time was very little. It took me a while to transform myself into the character, and that happened on the sets of 'Akhanda'. I had taken a few references from the real-life lady cops and noted every detail related to their dressing, mannerisms, and small-big details". Stylist and costume designer Raamz has been roped for designing costumes in the film. Speaking to Neeshita Nyayapati about designing costumes for Balakrishna's dual characters, he told that "Given Balakrishna’s larger-than-life persona, I wanted to create looks that would remain memorable for years to come. Boyapati Srinu's (the film’s director) Akhanda Movie is a Devotional Action Movie which will impress the audience. We also designed his tattoos and the Shiva Lingam locket that he uses in fight scenes".

Filming 

Principal photography of the film began in March 2020. After the filming was halted due to COVID-19 pandemic in India, final schedule of the film was resumed in July 2021 at Hyderabad. Few scenes of the film were shot at Gandhi Institute of Technology and Management, Hyderabad Campus. Filming of climax scenes of the film began in end-July 2021 at Tamil Nadu. Most of the action scenes were features Balakrishna and Srikanth. These action scenes were choreographed by Shiva. It was reported that the scenes were shot at Gingee Venkataramana Temple in Viluppuram district of Tamil Nadu. As part of the final schedule, the team next headed to Goa in September 2021 to shoot songs of the film. Filming was wrapped up in October 2021.

Music 

The film score and soundtrack album of the film is composed by Thaman S. The first single from the soundtrack, "Adigaa Adigaa" was released on 18 September 2021. The second single "Akhanda Title Song" was released on 8 November 2021. The last single of the album "Jai Balayya" was released on 27 November 2021, during the pre-release event of the film held at Hyderabad. The music rights were acquired by Lahari Music.

Release

Theatrical 
The film was initially planned to be released on 28 May 2021. But due to the COVID-19 pandemic in India, the film was delayed to 2 December 2021. The Tamil dubbed version of the film was released on 28 January 2022. The film was also dubbed in Hindi under the same title.

Home media 
Digital distribution rights of the film were acquired by Disney+ Hotstar for ₹15 crore. Satellite rights of the film were purchased by Star Maa. The film was premiered on Hotstar on 21 January 2022  and became the most watched regional film on OTT platforms. The movie had its television premier on Star Maa on 10 April 2022.

Reception

Critical response 
A reviewer from The Hans India rated 3 out of 5 stars, and called it Balakrishna's "one man show," adding "Living up to the expectations, Akhanda also showers a mass treat on the fans. The film is impressive in the way it was made." However, the reviewer was critical of predictable plot and screenplay. 123telugu.com rated the film 3.25 out of 5 stars and stated, "Akhanda is a feast for hardcore fans and Balayya gives them ample moments to cherish with his stunning act."

Writing for The Times of India, Neeshita Nyayapati wrote, "While the basic premise of Akhanda is interesting, especially the way Boyapati sets it up by weaving a historical story with mass moments in a way only he can, he soon loses the plot (literally) and gets carried away with giving Akhanda and Murali mass moments that are sure to elicit whistles but don’t do anything for the story." In her review for The Hindu, Sangeetha Devi Dundoo also echoes the same. "The film gets tiresome post intermission and the incessantly high voltage background score doesn’t help either," she added.

The Indian Express critic Manoj Kumar R said that the film was "an assault on the senses." Kumar was critical of Boyapati's usage of spirituality to provide a moral justification for the character to slaughter people with impunity while trying to appear as pro-progress and pro-rational. In an other negative review, Ram Venkat Srikar of Cinema Express, wrote: "Akhanda is a quintessential Boyapati Sreenu outing where logic dies a brutal death even before the title appears and the audience die a slow death for the next 167 minutes."

Box office 
Akhanda collected ₹20.8 crore in the Telugu states on its opening day. Whereas, it has collected a total of ₹29.60 crore worldwide on its opening day. The film collected ₹44 crore, by the second day of its release. At the United States box office, it collected of more than $500,000 within two days of its release. By the third day of the film's release, it had collected ₹56.90 crore worldwide. After four days, the film collected ₹66.7 crores.

By the end of first week, the film grossed ₹79.9 crore worldwide. The film crossed the 95.9 crore worldwide gross in 11 days. By the end of its run, the film grossed ₹200 crores. In theatres, the film completed 50 days in 103 centres.

Accolades

Notes

References

External links 
 

2020s masala films
2020s Telugu-language films
2021 action drama films
2021 films
Fictional portrayals of the Andhra Pradesh Police
Film productions suspended due to the COVID-19 pandemic
Films about corruption in India
Films about criminals
Films about Hinduism
Films about organised crime in India
Films about terrorism in India
Films based on Asian myths and legends
Films scored by Thaman S
Films set in Andhra Pradesh
Films set in Uttar Pradesh
Films shot at Ramoji Film City
Films shot in Goa
Films shot in Tamil Nadu
Twins in Indian films
Indian action drama films
Indian crime action films
Indian films based on actual events
Films about mining
Works about mining